David Lindley (born 23 April 1979) is an English badminton player and coach.  The right-handler, Lindley started playing badminton at aged six, and in the junior event, he becoming boys' doubles U-19 national champion in 1997 and 1998. Lindley junior also won the mixed doubles bronze medal at the 1997 European Junior Championships in Nymburk, Czech Republic.

In the international event, he won double title at the 2000 Scottish and Iceland International, and at the 2006 Slovak International tournaments in the men's and mixed doubles event. In the national event, Lindley who represented Nottinghamshire, was the men's doubles finalist at the national championships in 2004 partnered with Kristian Roebuck, 2006 with Simon Archer, 2007 with Chris Langridge, and in 2008 with Richard Eidestedt, Now he work as assistant pathway coach at the England national badminton team.

Achievements

European Junior Championships
Mixed doubles

BWF Grand Prix 
The BWF Grand Prix has two levels: Grand Prix and Grand Prix Gold. It is a series of badminton tournaments, sanctioned by Badminton World Federation (BWF) since 2007. The World Badminton Grand Prix sanctioned by International Badminton Federation (IBF) since 1983.

Men's doubles

Mixed doubles

 BWF Grand Prix Gold tournament
 BWF & IBF Grand Prix tournament

BWF International Challenge/Series
Men's doubles

Mixed doubles

 BWF International Challenge tournament
 BWF International Series tournament

References

External links 

1979 births
Living people
Sportspeople from Nottinghamshire
English male badminton players